Gilly is a Charleroi Metro station, located in Gilly (part of the Charleroi municipality), in fare zone 2. Gilly is an underground station featuring a central platform

Until the opening of the Soleilmont extension on 27 February 2012, Gilly was the terminus of former lines 54 and 55.

Gilly station was opened on 28 August 1992, although it had been built in the eighties. It was refurbished in 2008 and reopened in its current version on 23 April 2008. One of the walls is adorned with coat of arms of other Gilly'''s in Europe, while the opposite wall features the lyrics of El pétite gayole, a song in Walloon language written by Belgian artist Oscar Sabeau.

While trams drive on the right on most of the Charleroi Pre-metro network, they drive on the left on the Gilly line.

 Nearby points of interest 
 Gilly city hall.
 Gilly municipal swimming pool.
 Athénée Royal de Gilly'' (school).

Transfers 
TEC Charleroi bus lines 10, 14d, 17dim, 27, 28, 37, 172, 710.

Charleroi Metro stations
Railway stations opened in 1992